Brad Wilkin (born 8 December 1995) is an Australian rugby union player who plays as a Flanker for the Super Rugby team the . He has also represented Australia in the under 20s team.

Super Rugby statistics

References

Australian rugby union players
1995 births
Living people
Rugby union flankers
Brisbane City (rugby union) players
New South Wales Country Eagles players
New South Wales Waratahs players
Melbourne Rebels players
Rugby union players from New South Wales